The skygazer shiner (Notropis uranoscopus) is a small-sized cyprinid fish species found in the Alabama River drainage in Alabama, USA.

References 

 Robert Jay Goldstein, Rodney W. Harper, Richard Edwards: American Aquarium Fishes. Texas A&M University Press 2000, p. 96
 

Notropis
Fish described in 1959